John Enoyogiere Edokpolo  (9 October 1918 – 17 June 1996) was a Nigerian businessman in the rubber industry and founder of Edokpolo Grammar Schools in Benin City, Nigeria. Edokpolo was also a property developer who created a number of residential and commercial estates in the then Mid-Western Region, and made contributions to the rule of law that resulted in numerous precedents in cases cited today in courts throughout Nigeria.

Early life
Edokpolo was born to Mr. Asemota Edokpolo, a poor herbalist and Mrs. Emeikhase Edokpolo. He could not complete his elementary education due to financial constraints. With no money to continue his education, he went into trading in various items like kerosene, bicycle and rubber. He eventually owned a rubber processing factory, Edokpolo Rubber Factory, which employed hundreds of staff and traded with S Thomopolos, a foreign firm in the rubber market.<ref name="the eagle 2012">Osasu Ekpen Isibor (2012). //John Enoyogiere Edokpolo – The eagle on the iroko, </ref>

Political career
Edokpolo was one of several leaders who worked for the creation of the Mid-Western Region in 1963. He formed a political party called Mid-West Peoples Congress, and later the Mid-west Democratic Party (MDP). He was appointed Commissioner for Trade and Industry of the then mid-western region in 1963 by former Premier, Chief (Dr.) Dennis Osadebay. In this role he donated his salaries and allowances to the government.

Episcopal career
Edokpolo attained the position of Archbishop in 1988. He built a church, Christian Salvation Church, Dawson Road, Benin City, where he regularly worshiped with his family, students and staff of his educational establishments.

Educational work
Edokpolo built the following schools:
 Edokpolo Primary School, Benin City, 1953
 Edokpolo Secondary Modern School, Benin City, 1956
 Edokpolo Grammar School, Benin City, 1960

Death and dispute over estate
Edokpolo died in 1996, and his estate became subject to a protracted legal dispute by surviving members of his family.

References

Bibliography
 Obaisuko Atafo (1990). A biography of Archbishop Dr. John Edokpolo, J.P., 
 Osasu Ekpen Isibor (2012). //John Enoyogiere Edokpolo – The eagle on the iroko,

External links
 Osarhieme Benson Osadolor (2016). 20 Years Remembrance for Late Archbishop Dr. John Enoyogiere Edokpolo
 Sunny Ojeiduma. 100 Prominent Benin Families In Edo State
 Nowamagbe A. Omoigui (2013). The creation of the mid-west region of Nigeria and the life and times of Senator Dalhton Ogieva Asemota O.B.E. 
 https://legalpediaresources.com/advancedSearch?search_api_views_fulltext=&page=1883
 http://www.modernghana.com/news/307006/1/politics-and-legacies-arch-bishop-john-enoyogiere-.html
 https://www.facebook.com/pages/Edokpolor-Grammar-School-Benin-City/127209583957922

20th-century Nigerian businesspeople
Nigerian educators
1918 births
1996 deaths
People from Benin City